Center Grove High School is a high school located in Greenwood, Indiana. A part of Center Grove Community School Corporation, it serves western Greenwood and most of Bargersville.  Founded in 1884, the high school has always been located at the same intersection in White River Township, Johnson County, Indiana.

Athletics
Current Athletic Director: Joe Bronkella 

The Center Grove Trojans compete as an independent, with no conference affiliation. The school colors are red and white. The following IHSAA sanctioned sports are offered:

Baseball (boys)
Basketball (girls & boys)
Girls state champion - 1996
Cross country (girls & boys)
-Boys 3rd place State finalist 2022
Football (boys)
State champion - 2008, 2015, 2020, 2021, 2022
Golf (girls & boys)
Boys state champion - 2017, 2021
Soccer (girls & boys)
Boys state champion - 2015
Softball (girls)
State champion - 1986, 1995, 1998, 2003, 2009, 2015, 2019
Swimming and diving (girls & boys)
Tennis (girls & boys)
Boys state champion - 2001, 2008
Track (girls & boys)
Boys state champion - 2011
Volleyball (girls)
State champion - 2000
Wrestling (boys)

Demographics
The demographic breakdown of the 2,447 students enrolled in 2013-2014 was as follows:
Male - 53.0%
Female - 47.0%
Native American/Alaskan - 0.3%
Asian/Pacific islanders - 2.1%
Black - 1.2%
Hispanic - 3.1%
White - 91.5%
Multiracial - 1.8%

15.7% of the students were eligible for free or reduced lunch.

Fine arts
Center Grove has numerous vocal and instrumental music groups in addition to a theatre program.

The Center Grove High School marching band won first place at the 1995 Bands of America Grand National Finals.

Notable alumni
Aaron Halterman - Former NFL tight end 
Brad Long - Actor
Aaron Waltke - Emmy Award-winning screenwriter
Dave Kneebone - Film and television producer, Abso Lutely Productions
Brienne Pedigo-Christopher - Reporter, ESPN
Trayce Jackson-Davis - Mr. Indiana Basketball and forward for the Indiana Hoosiers
Russ Yeast - NFL safety for the Los Angeles Rams
Shamar Bailey- Mixed Martial Arts Fighter
Michelle McKeehan - American Swimmer

See also
 List of high schools in Indiana

References

External links

Center Grove Community School Corporation

Public high schools in Indiana
Educational institutions established in 1884
Schools in Johnson County, Indiana
1884 establishments in Indiana